Lee's Summit North High School is a high school that serves grades 912. It is in Lee's Summit, Missouri, United States and is the second of three high schools opened there. The other two schools are Lee's Summit West High School and Lee's Summit High School. Lee's Summit North opened in the fall of  1995. Their mascot is the Bronco. The school offers classes for the IB Diploma. Bernard Campbell Middle School students attend Lee’ Summit North.

Academics

Lee's Summit North's A Debate team took third place  in Public Forum debate at the Missouri State High School Activities Association (MSHSAA) 2006 Speech & Debate Championship. In 2007, the Lee's Summit Debate Team sent 6 students to nationals—one team in Policy Debate, one team in Public Forum Debate, one individual in congress and one individual in Lincoln-Douglas Debate. Ben Jewell is the debate coach.
LSN Youth in Government is one of the largest delegations to attend the Clark State convention, in 2011 they had seven of the thirteen bills passed into YIG Law. Sponsored by Sarah Jones Courtney and Rhonda Ireland.

Athletics

The Lee's Summit North Boys Track & Field Team won the state championship in 2005 and 2007. They also took 2nd place in 2004 and 3rd place in 2006. The Boys Cross Country Team won the state championship in 2010 and took 2nd place in 2009. Also, the Lee's Summit North Baseball team placed second in the Class 4 Missouri State Baseball Championships in 2009.

The girls soccer team won state in 2000 and took second in both 2002 and 2009.

The Varsity cheerleading squad won the 5A Class state championships in 2004 and 2005, which took place at the University of Missouri in Columbia, Missouri in November of each year. In 2006, the squad placed fourth. Also the varsity cheerleading squad is a 4- time State championship starting from 2014-2018

The Varsity girls tennis team won state in 2013 and placed third in 2012.

NFL wide receiver Tyreek Hill began coaching as an assistant for the schools football team in 2020.

Theatre

Lee's Summit North theatre has received 2 Outstanding Overall Production awards from Bluestar, a local theatre awards program.

Notable alumni
Dennis Hopeless, American comics writer
Tommy Frevert, American football player

References

1995 establishments in Missouri
Buildings and structures in Lee's Summit, Missouri
Educational institutions established in 1995
High schools in Jackson County, Missouri
Public high schools in Missouri